Zafir Premčević (1872—1937) was a Serbian Chetnik commander in Old Serbia and Macedonia during the Macedonian Struggle, who also participated in the Balkan Wars and World War I.

Life
Premčević was born in the village of Ljupšte in the Poreče region, at the time part of the Ottoman Empire (now R. Macedonia). He joined the Serbian Chetnik Organization and organized the first Serbian četa (band) in Poreče in March 1904, which he then submitted to the command of vojvoda (duke) Micko Krstić. Premčević was the assistant of Micko Krstić, and after Micko was returned by the Serbian Committee to Serbia, Premčević became vojvoda of a band in charge of pursuing the Albanian kachaks. He was an active guerilla fighter until 1908, when the Young Turk Revolution saw all rebels putting down their weapons. He participated in the Battle of Kumanovo in the detachment of vojvoda Vojin Popović-Vuk. He died in 1937.

See also
 List of Chetnik voivodes

References

Sources

20th-century Serbian people
1872 births
1937 deaths
Serbian rebels
Serbian military leaders
Serbian military personnel of the Balkan Wars
Serbian military personnel of World War I
People from Makedonski Brod Municipality
Royal Serbian Army soldiers
Serbs of North Macedonia